The New Caledonia Super Ligue 2013 season was the 40th season of the FCF since its establishment in 1962. The champions were chosen to represent the New Caledonia Super Ligue in the 2014–15 OFC Champions League.

Standings

References

External links
Season at soccerway.com

New Caledonia Super Ligue seasons
New
2013 in New Caledonian sport